Corinne Alison Manogue (born March 3, 1955) is an American physicist who has worked in general relativity, mathematical physics, and physics education.  She was elected a Fellow of the American Physical Society in 2005, and was an inaugural Fellow of the American Association of Physics Teachers in 2014.

Her early research studied quantum field theory in curved space, including a treatment of rotating frames of reference.  More recently, her work has focused on applications of the octonions to the theory of fundamental particles.

She was a graduate student under Bryce DeWitt at the University of Texas, where she received her Ph.D. in 1984. Her dissertation, titled The Vacuum in the Presence of Electromagnetic Fields and Rotating Boundaries, contained two separate results: a treatment of the gravitational Casimir effect in rotating reference frames, and a discussion of superradiance in both gravitational and electromagnetic contexts.

The latter work revealed a physically important sign error in the treatment of the electromagnetic case in standard textbooks.
 She is currently a professor of physics at Oregon State University.  In addition to her ongoing work in mathematical physics, she has made significant contributions in physics education.  Since 1997, she has directed the Paradigms in Physics Project, a complete restructuring of the undergraduate physics major around several core "paradigms".  She is also coauthor of a book on the octonions released in 2015.

Bibliography
 
 
 
 
 (2015) Tevian Dray and Corinne A. Manogue, The Geometry of the Octonions (World Scientific)

References

External links
 Corinne Manogue's home page
 Paradigms Project
 Vector Calculus Bridge Project

1955 births
Living people
21st-century American physicists
American relativity theorists
Oregon State University faculty
Mount Holyoke College alumni
University of Texas at Austin College of Natural Sciences alumni
Fellows of the American Physical Society